189 km is a rural locality (a passing loop) in Demyanovskoye Rural Settlement of Leninsk-Kuznetsky District, Russia. The population was 25 as of 2010.

Geography 
The passing loop is located on the Yurga-Tashtagol line, 11 km north of Leninsk-Kuznetsky (the district's administrative centre) by road. Krasnaya Polyna is the nearest rural locality.

References 

Rural localities in Kemerovo Oblast